is a six-episode OVA series produced by Sunrise and Bandai Visual, released from February 25, 1999 to July 25, 1999. The OVA series was initially released in North America on DVD in 2002 by Bandai Entertainment.  At Otakon 2013, the OVAs, along with a bunch of other former Bandai Entertainment properties were rescued by Sentai Filmworks.

Plot
In 1976, an alien species known as the Orgapiens invades Earth. To combat them, the Japanese and American military forces have collaborated on a giant robot known as Z-Mind. Z-Mind is piloted by three sisters: Ayame, Renge and Sumire.

Characters

Episode List

References

External links
 

1999 anime OVAs
Fiction set in 1976
Action anime and manga
Bandai Entertainment anime titles
Bandai Visual
Mecha anime and manga
Sentai Filmworks
Sunrise (company)